Sebastian Doggart is an English-American television producer, director, writer, journalist, translator, cinematographer and human rights activist.

Education
Doggart was educated at Montessori-style primary schools; Haverford School; Horris Hill School; Eton College, where he won an Oppidan Scholarship and the Queen's Prize for French; and King's College, Cambridge, where he obtained the top First class degree in Social and Political Sciences, and an MA, and was elected a Scholar. In 1984 he became the last student in Eton's history to receive corporal punishment.

Early writing career
Doggart began his career as a journalist in Latin America, working as a reporter on the Lima Times during two years he took off before going to Cambridge. Within three months on the job, he was promoted to co-Editor of the newspaper. At 19, he was the youngest editor the paper had had. In 1990, he moved to Argentina, where he became Finance and Economics Editor for the Buenos Aires Herald, chronicling an extraordinary period of hyperinflation, wholescale privatizations, and deregulation under President Carlos Menem's neo-liberal government.

Doggart parleyed his journalism work into a book, Investment Opportunities in Argentina, which had a foreword by Menem himself. Published in 1990, a month after he went to Cambridge, Doggart's own tutor, David Lehmann, reviewed the book in Professional Investor: "As the first optimistic economic report on Argentina to have been produced for some 20 years, this study acts as a clear indicator of the international business community's growing interest in the region."

Theatre career
After leaving Cambridge, Doggart trained as a drama director at Central School of Speech and Drama. His production of Ms Learwhich radically re-interpreted King Lear as a neo-Thatcherite womanperformed at theatres in London and Amsterdam. On graduating, he directed productions for eminent British companies Cheek by Jowl (world tour of The Duchess of Malfi); Actors Touring Company (Ion by Euripides); Theatre Museum Covent Garden (Playing with Fire by August Strindberg) and Creation Theatre Company (Romeo and Juliet, which Doggart set in 18th century Ireland, with English Capulets and Irish Montagues).

Doggart established himself as the leading translator/director of Latin American plays on the British stage. His production of Mistress of Desires, on which he collaborated directly with Nobel Laureate Mario Vargas Llosa, premiered in 1993. He worked directly with Carlos Fuentes on the British premiere of Orchids in the Moonlight, a dream play about the love between two Mexican actresses exiled in Hollywood's maze of mirrors. Doggart rehearsed the play in Cuba and opened in the Teatro Nacional, Havana. The production went on to perform at the Edinburgh Festival. According to Scotland on Sunday, the production was "rich in language and movement, fantasy and reality, sensuality and cruelty; as iconoclastic as the magic realist boom of the 1960s." In 1994, Doggart translated and directed Night of the Assassins, by the Cuban author Jose Triana, staging it at the Technis theatre in London and at the Edinburgh Festival. According to The Scotsman: "Brilliant, at times almost unbearable to watch, the British premiere of this award-winning Cuban play is utterly compelling... The atmosphere of oppression is almost tangible as the audience feel themselves entangled in the hysteria and power games of three siblings enacting or re-enacting the murder of their parents." In 1996, Doggart translated and directed a double bill of plays at The Gate theatre: Saying Yes, by Griselda Gambaro and Rappaccini's Daughter, by Nobel Laureate Octavio Paz, with whom he collaborated on the translation. Sarah Alexander played the leading role of Beatrice. That same translation has been staged internationally, including a production by the Santa Fe Playhouse in July 2006. Doggart has since translated the only plays of two other leading Latin American writers: Diatribe of Love against a sitting man, by Gabriel García Márquez, and The Kings by Julio Cortázar.

In 1998, Doggart produced Northern Stage's 'Lorca Fiesta', a major festival in Newcastle upon Tyne to celebrate the centenary of the birth of Spanish poet Federico García Lorca. The event included an academic conference of international scholars and translators of Lorca and a dramatization of Lorca's Poet in New York, which Doggart adapted and directed. He was also producer and dramaturg for The Moon Comes Out, Federico, a collaboration between Northern Stage and the Seville-based company Octubre Danza, which fused story-telling, contemporary dance and live cante jondo to enact Lorca's long poem "Lament to Ignacio Sanchez Mejias".

In 2000, Doggart co-founded the Gaia Arts Center in Havana, Cuba, dedicated to providing theater practitioners with a safe and inspiring place in which to create. In 2007, Doggart devised and co-directed the live performance piece, Balance of Ice, which combined three elements: a piece of music by Canadian composer Andrew Staniland that was inspired by the sounds of ice sheets calving; a dance performance by acclaimed Cuban ballerina Viengsay Valdes that fragmented her usual balletic virtuosity; and edited moving images of the polar ice caps and the threats facing them.

Between 2007–2008, Doggart translated and directed Cocinando con Elvis, a Spanish version of Lee Hall's play Cooking with Elvis, about food, sex, happiness, and Elvis Presley. The production opened at the Teatro Nacional in Havana, and was the first premiere of a British play in Cuba since An Inspector Calls opened in 1947.

Television career
In 1999, Doggart branched into television production, where he produced and/or directed for the BBC (Tomorrow's World); Channel Four (Living on the Line), and worked as an associate producer on ITV series (The South Bank Show and Two Thousand Years). The Financial Times wrote of Two Thousand Years: "Well made and highly informative, the first series truly to deserve the 'Millennium label'." His interview profiles included Germaine Greer, Kenneth Branagh and Nobel prize-winning Octavio Paz.

In 2000, Doggart moved to the United States where he produced/directed major TV series including:
 Wife Swap for ABC and RDF Media, an Emmy-nominated show in which two families from vastly different social classes and lifestyles, swap wives/mothers for two weeks. Doggart's film, about a New Jersey woman who treated her plastic dolls as her own children and went to the Alabama countryside to live with a man whose favourite food was armadillo with ketchup, was described as "the strangest season premiere ever," received an A+ critical rating, and clocked 3.57m viewers.
 Project Runway for Bravo, described by The New York Times as "the Prada of reality shows", and nominated for a 2005 Primetime Emmy;
 15 Films About Madonna for A&E – a one-hour one-off film, notable because Doggart directed and co-wrote 15 short films of totally different genres: animation, documentary, drama, mock political campaign ads, mock infomercial, comedy, mock 1950s PSA, and music video. The film was chosen to represent Great Britain at the 2008 Muestra de Jovenes Realizadores  in Havana, Cuba and played at the prestigious Cine Charles Chaplin.
 Two series (15 episodes) of Damage Control (TV series) for MTV, directing celebrities including Kelly Clarkson and Hulk Hogan
 30 Days for FX, hosted by Oscar-nominated Morgan Spurlock and nominated for a Producers Guild of America award
 Things I Hate About You for Bravo, a show where spouses identified a number of irritating traits in their partner, and then revealed them on camera, so that a panel of relationship experts could vote which was the better partner.
 American Candidate for Showtime Network, a reality show about aspiring presidential candidates
 Hollywood Vice for E4, a documentary series following the lives of policemen and criminals on both sides of the moral divide in Los Angeles. According to The Express: "This warts-and-all series gives a shocking insight into what goes on after dark on the back streets of LA."
 Raid Gauloises for Channel 4/TF1, an adventure race over Vietnam
 History of Movie Genres for Film4/Bravo

Film career

After writing and directing two short fictional films, Hole in the Wall and Three and a Bed, Doggart set up Tribute Films, a company that produced films for individuals, their loved ones and their pets. His production of Carol Connors and Her Cats, launched a longstanding collaboration with Connors, a passionate ailurophile (cat lover), Elvis Presley's former girlfriend, and a twice-Oscar-nominated songwriter. The film was lauded by Charlene Tilton as "the funniest thing I have ever seen". The Los Angeles Times described it as the first pet hagiography film ever made, and as "the Cadillac of filmed pet memorials".

In 2004, Doggart moved to New York City. From 2006, he spent three years making Courting Condi, the first musical docu-tragi-comedy in the history of cinema. The film won 26 awards on the festival circuit, screened at the Cannes Film Festival, and was critically acclaimed. By combining screenings of the film with public debates about its subject, Condoleezza Rice's record in office, Doggart fueled calls for Rice to be investigated for human rights abuses and war crimes.

In 2009, Doggart directed and produced another film about Rice, American Faust: From Condi to Neo-Condi. This investigative documentary explored in greater depth Rice's pursuit and alleged misuse of power, and revealed the direct role she had in fabricating reasons for going to war in Iraq, and in ordering torture, especially in CIA black sites around the world. The film won numerous awards on the festival circuit, and was broadcast on a raft of international stations, including Al-Jazeera.

In 2012, he completed a third feature film, True Bromance, an irreverent romantic comedy starring Jim Norton, Adrian Grenier, Frank Luntz, Devin Ratray and himself about the absurd role friends and family play when people fall in love. The film won 19 awards on the festival circuit, including Best Film at the Harlem International Film Festival, and Best Actor and Best Screenplay at the Washington DC International Film Festival. 'The Brooklyn Paper' described it as "a bromance for the ages." ‘The Brooklyn Eagle’ wrote: "Starring possibly the most surreal comedy troupe ever... True Bromance is consistently unnerving, funny and surprising and features an original comic-book style".

Doggart has written two other screenplays, Casanova's Return and Clinton a Neuro-Musical.

He is a voting member of the Academy of Television Arts & Sciences and of the British Academy of Film and Television Arts.

Political and human rights career
In 1993, Doggart led an Amnesty International campaign called Why the Silence? to investigate human rights abuses in Equatorial Guinea.

In 1997, Doggart was a campaign manager on Martin Bell's successful bid to become the first Independent MP to be elected to the British Parliament since 1945.

In 2000, Doggart co-founded the Felices Los Normales program at the Gaia arts center in Havana, Cuba, raising awareness about HIV/AIDS through improvised theater.

From 2009-10, Doggart used the release of his documentary American Faust: From Condi to Neo-Condi to launch a campaign to bring to justice officials in the Bush Administration whom contributors in the film – including attorneys from the American Civil Rights Union, Amnesty International and Reprieveallege are guilty of war crimes and torture. Amnesty International screened the film at Stanford University on the eve of Rice's return to the Hoover Institution, adding to pressure on Stanford authorities to expel her for allegedly dishonoring the college's Fundamental Standard to show "respect for order, morality, personal honor and the rights of others as is demanded of good citizens." Doggart teamed up with students at the University of Denver, where Rice was an undergraduate, by organizing a debate on the motion 'This house believes that Condoleezza Rice should stand trial for war crimes.' Proposing the motion was Rice's political theory professor, Alan Gilbert; defending Rice was Republican State Senator Sean Mitchell. The event met fierce resistance from the University administration. Vice Chancellor Jim Berscheidt had already tried to shut down a shoot and denied the producers access to archive of Josef Korbel. Up until the last moment, Berscheidt sought to use bureaucratic obstacles and alleged intimidation of students to stop the event. However, the screening and debate did eventually take place, with a strong turn-out, and webcast on both Mogulus television  and through the Amnesty International website.

At a screening at the Starz Denver film festival in December 2009, and again in an interview with Progressive Voice, Doggart called for the prosecution of ten Bush Administration officials: President George W. Bush, Condoleezza Rice (as NSA and chair of the Group of Principals who authorized the torture techniques), Defense Secretary Donald Rumsfeld, Vice-President Dick Cheney, CIA bosses George Tenet and Porter Goss, General Geoffrey D. Miller (commander at Abu Ghraib and Guantanamo), Secretary of State Colin Powell, and Attorney Generals John Ashcroft and Alberto Gonzales. In February 2010, Doggart presented a screening of the film at New York's Revolution Books with human rights organizations World Can't Wait and War Criminals Watch. Screenings in Minnesota were also organized by Coleen Rowley, a former FBI agent turned whistle-blower, who called the film "a must-see documentary". The campaign continued through social networking sites and interviews in the press, radio  and on PBS but has so far failed to secure its objective of Rice's arrest, prosecution and imprisonment. Efforts to this end were escalated in May 2010, following the announcement that Rice was to play a concert with Aretha Franklin. Doggart responded to this by corralling a group of human rights activists, including Rowley, War Criminals Watch, and Down With Tyranny, to pressure Franklin and the Philadelphia Orchestra to dump her from the concert billing, and to encourage either a citizen's arrest, or one instigated by Attorney General Eric Holder. These protests continued at a Denver University awards dinner, where Madeleine Albright presented the 2010 Josef Korbel Outstanding Alumni Award to Rice, while activists warned guests outside that "there's a war criminal in the area".

In 2014 and 2015, Doggart was the chief judge on the annual Tackling Torture Video contest.

In 2016, Doggart was appointed President of the New York Families Civil Liberties Union, and 2018 was made Executive Director of the national FCLU.

Writing career
Doggart has had three books published: Fire Blood and the Alphabet: One Hundred Years of Lorca focused on Spanish playwright and poet, Federico García Lorca. The book included poems, translations and an essay by Doggart, as well as eminent Lorca scholars, and was published in a second edition in January 2010. Stage Labyrinths: Latin American Plays included Doggart's translations of five Latin American dramatic works, as well as interviews with the writers and a history of Latin American theater His third book is on the Argentine economy. He has been a principal contributor to five other books – Stages of Conflict: A critical anthology of Latin American theater and Performance (University of Michigan Press, 2008), Purple Homicide: Fear and Loathing on Knutsford Heath (Bloomsbury, 1998), Raymond Chandler: A Biography (Atlantic, 1997), Reflections in a Family Mirror (Red House, 2002), and Time Out: Havana (Penguin, 2001, 2005, 2007) – and has written for New Statesman, The Guardian, The Independent, The Observer, The Telegraph, The Huffington Post  and The Sunday Telegraph.

In 2011, Doggart became a columnist for The Daily Telegraph, writing a twice-monthly column from New York on film, literary, political, family and comedic subjects. column . He also worked as a film reviewer for The Guardian . .

Family
Doggart is the grandson of the eminent ophthalmologist and writer James Hamilton Doggart; son of the author/development economist Caroline Doggart and the international financier and philanthropist Anthony Doggart; brother of the conservationist Nike Doggart; nephew of the cricketer and educator, Hubert Doggart; and cousin of the headmaster, Simon Doggart.

Publications
 Fire, Blood and the Alphabet: One Hundred Years of Lorca, with Michael Thompson, 1999, University of Durham, second edition 2010
  Latin American Plays, (editor), Nick Hern Books, 1996, 
 Time Out: Havana, (contributor), 2001, 
 Time Out: Havana, (contributor), 2005, 
 Time Out: Havana,  (contributor), 2007, 
 Stages of Conflict: A critical anthology of Latin American theater and Performance, (contributor), University of Michigan Press, 2008, 
 Investment Opportunities in Argentina, 1991, Southern Development Trust, 
 Cary Grant: A Class Apart, Graham McCann, 1998, Columbia University Press, 
 Raymond Chandler: A Biography, Tom Hiney, 1999, Grove Press, 
 Purple Homicide: Fear and Loathing on Knutsford Heath, John Sweeney, 1998, Bloomsbury Press,

Newspaper and journal articles
 'Why I love reality TV', by Sebastian Doggart, The Observer,
 'Bellissimo! How we won Tatton', by Sebastian Doggart, New Statesman, pp. 28–30
 'Ultra-patriotic USA is dreaming of a star-spangled Christmas', by Sebastian Doggart & Oliver Poole, The Daily Telegraph, 24 December 2001
 'The new Millennium starts here', by Sebastian Doggart, The Sunday Telegraph, 12 December 1999, p. 19
 'Talking Latin', by Sebastian Doggart, Scotland on Sunday, 30 August 1992
 'All rise for a girl king', by Sebastian Doggart, The Guardian, 3 March 1997
 'Innocent Erendira', by Sebastian Doggart, Time Out, 29 Sep – 6 October 1993
 'Foxed by the Carnival,' by Sebastian Doggart, The Guardian, 28 August 2000, p. 15
 'The relentless rise of offshore centres', by Caroline Doggart & Sebastian Doggart, Impact, Jan/Feb 1998, issue 5, pp. 4–5

Reviews of work
 'Awards and Controversy for Courting Condi', by Rachel Heller, Haute Living, 24 February 2010 
 'Catwalks and Catfights', by Sean Smith, Newsweek, 28 February 2005, p. 61
 'Hemlines on the Stand', by Alessandra Stanley, The New York Times, 16 February 2005, p. 1
 'Opportunities in Argentina challenges a few investors', International Herald Tribune, 23–24 March 1991
 'Argentinian investment, anyone?', ABA Banking Journal, American Bankers Association, June 1991, p. 9
 'Argentina's great investment potential', The Independent, 27 April 1991, p. 22
 'El lector como Edipo Rex,' by Jorge Lagos, Cronica Latina, March 1997,
 'Review: Fire, Blood and the Alphabet', Forum For Modern Language Studies 37/3, 2001
 'Reviews', by Sarah Leggott, A.U.M.L.A., May 2001
 'Steps Argentina towards stability?', Friso Endt Business Report, Vol VI, 19 April 1991
 'Few takers for lone venture', The Daily Telegraph, 20 March 1991
 'Investing in the gaucho club', by Dr. David Lehmann, Professional Investor, 1991
 'Argentina steps towards stability', by Martin Barrow, The Times, 18 March 1991
 'Argentina: petrochemical paradise?', Chemistry and Industry, number 10, 20 May 1991
 'Night of the Assassins', by Thea Jourdan, The Scotsman, 29 August 1994
 'Orchids in the Moonlight', Scotland on Sunday, 23 August 1992
 'Love, Fidelity and cats', by James Verini, Los Angeles Times, 28 November 2002
 'Hollywood Vice', Metro, 24 January 2002, p. 22
 'Two Thousand Years', Financial Times,, 28 April 1999, p. 22 (Arts)
 'How we became what we are', by Stephen Pile, Daily Telegraph,
 'TV review: Living on the Line', by Sue Greenway, Western Daily Press, 31 December 1999, p. 22
 'Time to forget those old TV acquaintances', by Paul Hoggart, The Times, 31 December 1999
 'Living on the Line (C4)', by Christopher Matthew, Daily Mail, 31 December 1999
 'Hollywood Vice', by Charlotte Civil, The Express, 8 August 2002, p. 49
 'Hollywood Vice', Daily Record, 8 August 2002, p. 37
 '30 Days', Hollywood Reporter, 15 June 2006
 'A search for self in the secret garden', The New Mexican, 21–27 July 2006

References

External links
 

Living people
British film producers
British film directors
British television producers
British television directors
Alumni of the Royal Central School of Speech and Drama
Alumni of King's College, Cambridge
People educated at Eton College
Year of birth missing (living people)